Redvale is a settlement slightly north of the Auckland metropolitan area, in New Zealand. Part of it is located in the North Shore, and most of Redvale is rural. It is located north of Fairview Heights, and borders Lonely Track Road. State Highway 1 runs through parts of Redvale, and the suburb is located in Albany ward.

The area of Redvale used to be a rural locality, but most of Redvale's purpose nowadays is to store rubbish in a landfill. The landfill is appearing to soon be full, and is apparently a source of power. It is home to half of the rubbish in Auckland.

Controversy 
On 17 October 2021, a video was posted to Instagram of a wild party in a Redvale home with up to 50 people. At the time, Auckland Region was under Alert Level 3 restrictions, meaning there couldn't be any more than 10 people gathering at once. The video shows people crammed inside the home, drinking, dancing and kissing and some dry humping together on a table. Due to the incident, two models were dropped from their agencies. Attendees have since apologized for the incident.

References 

Suburbs of Auckland